Beverley Palesa Ditsie (born 1971) is a South African lesbian activist, artist, and filmmaker. Ditsie is one of the founders of the gay rights organization Gay and Lesbian Organization of Witwatersrand.

In speaking about the importance of considering LGBT rights in the context of human rights at the 4th UN World Conference on Women in Beijing in 1995, she became the first openly lesbian woman to do. It was also the first time that the United Nations was addressed about LGBT issues, with Ditsie saying, “if the world conference on women is to address the concerns of all women, it must similarly recognise that discrimination based on sexual orientation is a violation of basic human rights”.

Biography 
Ditsie was born in Orlando West, Soweto, South,, Africa in 1971.

Activism 
Ditsie is one of the organizers of the first Pride March in South Africa. The parade took place in Johannesburg in 1990. Ditsie and her friend, Simon Nkoli, another activist, worked together on creating the pride event after Simon had the idea from his visit to America. During the event, she spoke on live TV, becoming a "cultural icon" and also a target for people's hatred and bigotry. She states that she had to be "escorted for about two weeks after the pride march" for her safety. Ditsie is critical of current pride activities because she sees a cultural and racial divide between LGBT people in South Africa.

Ditsie spoke at the United Nations Conference on Women in 1995, and was the person to address gay and lesbian rights before a U.N. 4th World Conference on Women." She attempted to convince U.N. delegates to "adopt resolutions recognizing sexual diversity."

Film and television career 
Ditsie has worked as an actress and director in television since 1980, making her the first black female child star in television.

In the late 1990s, she was in the reality show, Livewire - Communities, and was the only black lesbian on the show.

She has also written, directed and consulted in over 20 Documentaries, screened nationally and Internationally. Her first documentary film, Simon and I (2001), won a number of Audience Awards, including the 2004 Oxfam/Vues d’ Afrique best documentary, Montreal, Canada. The story of Simon and I is autobiographical, following her "personal and political journey" with Nkoli. Her film uses both interviews and archival material.

Filmography
 Simon & I (2002, co-directed with Nicky Newman)
 A Family Affair (2005, directed and written)
 The Commission - From Silence to Resistance (2017, directed, produced and written)
 Lesbians Free Everyone - The Beijing Retrospective (2020, directed, produced and written)

References

External links
Simon and I  (video)

1971 births
South African LGBT rights activists
People from Soweto
Living people
Lesbians
South African women activists